Nelson Custódia Nhamussua (Maputo, January 31, 2001), a.k.a. Nelsinho is a Mozambican professional basketball player who currently plays for A Politécnica of the Mozambican Division I Basketball League.

References

2001 births
Living people
Mozambican men's basketball players
Power forwards (basketball)